Callomyia elegans is a species of fly in the genus Callomyia found in Europe.

References

External links

Platypezidae
Insects described in 1804
Muscomorph flies of Europe